
Gmina Tyczyn is an urban-rural gmina (administrative district) in Rzeszów County, Subcarpathian Voivodeship, in south-eastern Poland.

Villages
Apart from the town of Tyczyn, Gmina Tyczyn contains the villages and settlements of Borek Stary, Hermanowa, Kielnarowa .

Neighbouring gminas
Gmina Tyczyn is bordered by the gminas of Błażowa, Boguchwała, Chmielnik, Hyżne and Lubenia.

References
Polish official population figures 2006

Tyczyn
Rzeszów County